Flexible learning is a principle of practice in formal education, concerned with increasing flexibility in the requirements, time and location of  study, teaching, assessment and certification

History
Flexible learning saw significant development in New Zealand and Australia throughout the late 90s and early 2000s, along with investments in online learning.

See also 
 Blended learning
 Flipped learning
 M-learning
 Networked learning
 Distance education
 Virtual education
 Virtual university

References

External links

 Educational and Institutional Flexibility of Australian Educational Software 
 Wikieducator course on flexible learning

Education by method
Experiential learning